Georg Fluckinger (born March 1, 1955) was an Austrian luger who competed in the late 1970s and early 1980s. Competing in three Winter Olympics, he won the bronze medal in the men's doubles event at Lake Placid in 1980.

In Luge World Cup, Fluckinger's best overall seasonal finish was second in men's doubles on five occasions (1978-9, 1979–80, 1981-2, 1983-4, 1984-5). He also finished third overall in the men's single World Cup championship in 1979-80.

References
1984 luge men's doubles results
1988 luge men's doubles results
DatabaseOlympics.com information on Fluckinger
Fuzilogik Sports - Winter Olympic results - Men's luge
Hickoksports.com results on luge and skeleton.
List of men's doubles luge World Cup champions since 1978.
List of men's singles luge World Cup champions since 1978.

1955 births
Living people
Austrian male lugers
Olympic lugers of Austria
Olympic bronze medalists for Austria
Lugers at the 1980 Winter Olympics
Lugers at the 1984 Winter Olympics
Lugers at the 1988 Winter Olympics
Olympic medalists in luge
Medalists at the 1980 Winter Olympics